Winnecke is a surname. Notable people with the name include:

Charles Winnecke (1857–1902), Australian explorer and botanist
Friedrich August Theodor Winnecke (1835–1897), German astronomer
Lloyd Winnecke (born 1960), American politician

See also
Winnecke 4, a double star in the constellation Ursa Major
Winnecke Catalogue of Double Stars, an astronomical catalogue of double stars published by Friedrich August Theodor Winnecke
7P/Pons–Winnecke, a periodic Jupiter-family comet in the solar system